Lee Ka Yi  (born 25 November 1993), also known as Ka Yi Lee, is a Hong Kong professional squash player. As of February 2018, she was ranked number 73 in the world.

Career
She has competed in many professional PSA World Tour and PSA World Series tournaments. She was chosen player of the month by the WSA in August 2015.

In 2018, she was part of the Hong Kong team that won the bronze medal at the 2018 Women's World Team Squash Championships.

References

1993 births
Living people
Hong Kong female squash players
Asian Games medalists in squash
Asian Games gold medalists for Hong Kong
Squash players at the 2018 Asian Games
Medalists at the 2018 Asian Games